Cyclopteropsis jordani, also known as the smooth lumpfish (although that name may lead to confusion with Aptocyclus ventricosus), is a species of lumpfish native to the Arctic and Northwest Atlantic, where it is known from the Kara Sea in Russia and Admiralty inlet in Nunavut, Canada. It is a benthic species found at depths less than 68 m (223 ft) and reaches 6.1 cm (2.4 inches) in standard length. C. jordani feeds on small invertebrates, including mollusks, crustaceans, and marine worms.

References 

jordani
Fish described in 1929
Taxa named by Vladimir Soldatov
Fish of Russia
Fish of Canada